Bodies of Evidence is an American television police drama series that aired on CBS between June 1992 and May 1993. The show starred Lee Horsley, and George Clooney in his last leading television role before ER. In its first season, the series was a relatively well-rated summer series, and was brought back for an eight-episode second season in spring 1993.

Plot
A team of homicide detectives, led by the veteran head of the department Lt. Ben Carroll (Lee Horsley), work cases in an unnamed big city. Carroll's team is made up of Det. Ryan Walker (George Clooney), a talented detective with a propensity to get too emotionally invested in his cases; Det. Nora Houghton, a rookie detective unsure of her skills; and Houghton's partner, Det. Will Stratton, a jaded veteran detective close to retirement. They are assisted in their cases by the department's forensics specialist, Lemar Samuels (Leslie Jordan). The series also attempts to highlight how the homicide detectives' work life impacts their personal lives.

Cast
 Lee Horsley as Lieutenant Ben Carroll
 George Clooney as Det. Ryan Walker
 Kate McNeil as Det. Nora Houghton
 Al Fann as Det. Will Stratton
 Leslie Jordan as Lemar Samuels
 Francis X. McCarthy as Sgt. Jimmy Houghton
 Lorraine Toussaint as Dr. Mary Rocket (season 1)
 Jennifer Hetrick as Bonnie Carroll
 Alan Fudge as Chief Frank Leland
 Kimberly Scott as Maggie Holland (season 2)

Series overview

Broadcast history
 Thursdays 10:00–11:00 a.m. (June – August 1992)
 Fridays 10:00–11:00 p.m. (March – May 1993)

Episodes

Season 1 (1992)

Season 2 (1993)

Reception
The critical reception to Bodies of Evidence was mixed to mostly negative. Tony Scott of Variety described the series' pilot as having "sharp production values, little humorous relief, and generally pro performances", though with "several off-putting touches". But Entertainment Weekly's Ken Tucker gave the show a "D" grade, calling it "Law & Order Lite — a show that comes on all hard-boiled and complicated but reworks plots that seem left over from Mannix." David Hiltbrand  of People magazine gave Bodies of Evidence a "C" grade, stating, "In the regular season, I probably wouldn't give this predictable, overwritten show a second look. This being the summer session, we grade on a curve." And Los Angeles Times' Chris Willman panned the show as "tired and sub-formulaic".

References

External links
 
 

CBS original programming
1992 American television series debuts
1993 American television series endings
1990s American drama television series
English-language television shows
American detective television series